Bridey Elliott (born July 27, 1990) is an American actress, comedian, writer, and film director.

Career
After graduating from the National Theater Institute, Elliott performed stand-up in New York and became a regular at the Upright Citizens Brigade Theatre.

She starred in the SXSW Grand Jury Prize–winning Fort Tilden (2015), and had a role in Steven Soderbergh's film Mosaic (2017). She also had a part in the HBO comedy Silicon Valley, and played tennis player Julie Heldman in Battle of the Sexes (2017).

Elliott's directorial debut, the short comedy Affections, premiered at the 2016 Sundance Film Festival and went on to win the Special Jury Prize at the Independent Film Festival Boston. Her feature-length directorial debut, Clara's Ghost, stars her mother, Paula Nierdert Elliott, and Haley Joel Osment; it premiered at the 2018 Sundance Film Festival. Her Saturday Night Live alumni father and sister were also in the movie, which was filmed at their home in Old Lyme, Connecticut.

Personal life 
Elliott's mother is a talent coordinator, and her father is actor/comedian Chris Elliott. Her grandfather was radio comedian Bob Elliott. Her older sister is actress/comedian Abby Elliott; they were both raised in Wilton, Connecticut.

Filmography

Film

Television

References

External links

1990 births
21st-century American actresses
21st-century American comedians
Place of birth missing (living people)
21st-century American writers
Film directors from New York (state)
Living people